is a railway station on the Chūō Main Line, Central Japan Railway Company in the city of  Shiojiri, Nagano Prefecture, Japan.

Lines

Layout
The station has two ground-level side platforms connected by a footbridge. The station is unattended.

Platforms

Adjacent stations

|-
!colspan=5|

History
Hideshio Station began as Hideshio Signal Stop on 10 September 1913. it was elevated to a full passenger station on 21 December 1926.  On 1 April 1987, it became part of JR Tōkai. A new station building was completed in 2009.

Passenger statistics
In fiscal 2015, the station was used by an average of 12 passengers daily (boarding passengers only).

Surrounding area
Motoyama-juku

See also
 List of Railway Stations in Japan

References

External links

Railway stations in Japan opened in 1926
Railway stations in Nagano Prefecture
Stations of Central Japan Railway Company
Chūō Main Line
Shiojiri, Nagano